Mios is a commune in the Gironde department in Nouvelle-Aquitaine in southwestern France.

Population
Its inhabitants are called Miossais.

Sights
The Saint Brice chapel has a bell dating from 1700 classed as a monument historique by the French Ministry of Culture in 1942.

The Romanesque St Martin church, enlarged in the 19th century, has a Gothic choir and chapels, and remnants of 16th century stained glass.

See also
Communes of the Gironde department
Parc naturel régional des Landes de Gascogne

References

Communes of Gironde